"Eyes Are the Soul" is the third and final single from MC Lyte's third album Act Like You Know. Produced by Wolf & Epic, it was released on April 9, 1992.

In the song Lyte talks about social issues such as AIDS, crack and teenage pregnancy.

Conception and composition 
In each verse of the song, Lyte describes a different afflicted person. The first person in the narrative is a male with HIV–AIDS, the second person is a crack addict wanted by the law, and the third is a young, black, pregnant teenager who is considering abortion.

Shortly after the single was released, speaking at a Baltimore school, she confessed that "Sometimes I get discouraged when I do songs like this and they don't get as popular as (others). I'm just trying to get the message out."

During an interview with Ebony in 2012, Lyte commented on the song's AIDS prevention message:

Appearances
"Eyes Are the Soul" was included on her compilation albums The Very Best of MC Lyte (2001), Rhyme Masters (2005), and Cold Rock a Party – Best of MC Lyte (2019) The music video was included on the compilation video album Lyte Years (1991).

Critical reception
Connie Johnson of the Los Angeles Times highlighted the song in her album review, saying "AIDS, crack addiction and teen pregnancy are topics treated with nonjudgmental empathy." James Bernard of Entertainment Weekly called the song "my own favorite", commenting "Lyte slips into a storytelling mode to convey the anguish of her peers who are grappling with AIDS, drug addiction, and the specter of the abortion clinic. Rather than tossing around empty rhetoric, Lyte takes us face-to-face with these people, forcing us to look into their eyes."

In a retrospective review, AllMusic's Alex Henderson also highlighted the song, describing it as "a poignant reflection on the destruction caused by crack cocaine". In a 2010 review, Quentin B. Huff of PopMatters commented on the song "In “Eyes Are the Soul”, MC Lyte turns the eyes into symbols of our collective humanity. There's a frailty in this symbolism, one that is echoed by the swelling synth backdrop and busy but light percussion." further highlighting its similarities to the TLC hit song "Waterfalls".

In the book Stare in the Darkness: The Limits of Hip-hop and Black Politics (2011), political scientist Lester Spence commented on the song:

Single track listing

12" Vinyl

A-Side
 "Eyes Are the Soul" (Soul Remix) (4:10)
 "Eyes Are the Soul" (Jazzy Soul Remix) (5:24)

B-Side
 "Eyes Are the Soul" (LP Version) (3:53)
 "Eyes Are the Soul" (Soul Remix Instrumental) (4:10)

Cassette Maxi-Single

A-Side
 "Eyes Are the Soul" (Soul Remix) (4:10)
 "Eyes Are the Soul" (Jazzy Soul Remix) (5:24)

B-Side
 "Eyes Are the Soul" (LP Version) (3:53)
 "Eyes Are the Soul" (Soul Remix Instrumental) (4:10)

Personnel
Credits are taken from the liner notes.
Lyrics By – MC Lyte
Mixed By – Carman Rizzo
Music By – Bret Mazur, Richard Wolf
Producer – Wolf & Epic

Charts

References

1992 songs
Songs written by Epic Mazur
MC Lyte songs
Atlantic Records singles
Songs written by Richard Wolf
Songs about drugs
Songs about HIV/AIDS
Songs about abortion
Songs written by MC Lyte